Dan Skattum is a Republican former member of the Montana Legislature.  He was representative for House District 62 from 2011 to 2013, representing the Livingston area. He ran again in 2012, losing to Democrat Reilly Neill. In 2018, he faced Democrat Laurie Bishop to represent House District 60.

References

External links
Home page

Year of birth missing (living people)
Living people
Republican Party members of the Montana House of Representatives
People from Livingston, Montana
Place of birth missing (living people)